Lacera nyarlathotepi is a moth of the family Erebidae.

Taxonomy
Although named, the species has not been officially described.

References

Lacera